Khazanah Nasional Berhad is the sovereign wealth fund of the Government of Malaysia, with the purpose of investing to deliver sustainable value for Malaysians. Through its investments and activities, Khazanah seeks to deliver sustainable economic and societal benefit for the nation that will help in Advancing Malaysia. This includes achieving long-term risk-adjusted returns across the portfolio, as well as undertaking investments that catalyse new growth areas, strengthen Malaysia’s economic competitiveness, and contribute to priority socioeconomic outcomes.  

Khazanah is a member of the International Forum of Sovereign Wealth Funds, which maintains and promotes the Santiago Principles on best practices in managing sovereign wealth funds. It is also a signatory of the United Nations-supported Principles for Responsible Investment (UNPRI), signatory of the Malaysian Code for Institutional Investors and a member of the Institutional Investor Council Malaysia (IIC), member of FCLTGlobal (Focusing Capital on the Long Term), and signatory of the Malaysian Anti-Corruption Commission's (MACC) Corporate Integrity Pledge.

Khazanah was incorporated under the Companies Act 2016 in Malaysia on 3 September 1993 as a public limited company and commenced operations a year later. Khazanah is owned by the Malaysian government and administered by the Minister of Finance Incorporated, except for one share held by the Federal Land Commissioner. It is governed by a board of directors comprising representatives from the Government and the corporate sector with diverse professional backgrounds and expertise.

In December 2021 the fund had US$30.5 billion in assets under management.

Financial highlights 
In 2021, Khazanah achieved a profit from operations of RM670 million compared to RM2.90 billion in 2020. Dividend income from investee companies fell to RM3.0 billion from RM5.2 billion and divestment gains of RM1.9 billion compared to RM2.7 billion in 2020. Khazanah declared a dividend of RM2.0 billion for 2021.

Khazanah’s financial position saw debt increase by 12% to RM48 billion from RM43 billion in 2020, while Realisable Asset Value (RAV) cover stood at 2.8 times.

Meanwhile, operating expenses dropped by 14% to RM420 million from RM490 million in 2020.

Khazanah’s overall portfolio Realisable Asset Value (RAV) stood at RM134.4 billion and Net Asset Value (NAV) was at 85.7 billion as at 31 December 2021.

History

Incorporation 
Khazanah was incorporated under the Companies Act 2016 on 3 September 1993 as a public limited company and commenced operations a year later. Except for one share owned by the Federal Land Commissioner, all the share capital of Khazanah is owned by the Minister of Finance Incorporated, a body incorporated pursuant to the Minister of Finance (Incorporation) Act 1957.

A refreshed mandate 
In 2018, the Government of Malaysia initiated a corporate restructuring and reorganisation of Khazanah, which involved leadership changes, a refresh of its mandate and objectives, and a review and revaluation of its investments.

Khazanah's mandate today is investing to deliver sustainable value for Malaysians. The mandate is to be achieved by pursuing commercial investments to preserve and grow long-term value of our assets, as well as undertaking investments that deliver economic or societal returns for the nation.

Investments 
Khazanah pursues its overall mandate through the following investment structure.

Investments Portfolio 
The Investments Portfolio is intended to be an intergenerational portfolio that seeks to generate risk-adjusted returns on a long-term basis, to preserve and grow the long-term value of our assets. The portfolio targets to generate a return of at least the Malaysian Consumer Price Index + 3% on a 5-year rolling basis. The Investments Portfolio’s return target is set by the Board and may be reviewed from time to time. The annual returns of the Investments Portfolio will be reinvested into the Fund and distributed to the Government based on the payout framework approved by the Board.  

The Investments Portfolio has the flexibility to invest across different geographies and asset classes in accordance with the strategic asset allocation.

Dana Impak Portfolio 
The Dana Impak Portfolio is intended to invest in increasing Malaysia’s economic competitiveness and in building national resilience while delivering socioeconomic impact for Malaysians. The portfolio targets to generate a return of at least the yield of the 10-year Malaysian Government Securities on a 5-year rolling basis and achieve its societal benefits and outcomes. The aforementioned returns target and pre-determined societal benefits and outcomes are set by the Board and may be reviewed from time to time.

The portfolio will invest and manage the assets according to investment themes for the benefit of the nation. The investment themes will be reviewed on a regular basis based on global economic megatrends and national priorities, taking into account Khazanah’s available resources and alignment with Khazanah’s mandate.

Developmental Assets 
The Developmental Assets is intended to deliver high economic impact through long-term developmental investments. These assets will be developed to achieve commercial viability at which point value realisation options may be considered.

The assets are subjected to the target of generating a return of at least the yield of the 10-year Malaysian Government Securities on a 5-year rolling basis and achieve its relevant national and/or societal benefits and outcomes. The aforementioned return target is set by the Board and may be reviewed from time to time.

Special Situations 
Special Situations Assets are defined and classified as assets that require turnarounds in terms of profitability and sustainable operating cash flows. These assets will have specific targets and action plans that are approved by the Board on an annual basis.  

These assets may be reclassified when they achieve commercial viability or undertakes a process to explore value realisation options upon approval of the Board.

Leadership and governance 
Board of directors

Khazanah is governed by its board of directors, which is led by Dato' Seri Anwar Ibrahim, Prime Minister of Malaysia and also Finance Minister, as chairman of the board. The board members comprise representatives from the Government as well as the corporate sector with diverse professional backgrounds and expertise. The managing director reports to the board. 

The board meets regularly and is ultimately accountable and responsible for Khazanah's overall governance and performance. A Board Charter sets out the roles and responsibilities of the board in overseeing the management of Khazanah.

Khazanah is guided by a framework that establishes a responsibility, authority and governance structure. Its Governance and Risk Management Framework comprises a Risk Management Policy, Schedule of Matters for the Board, Limits of Authority for the management, Code of Conduct for employees, and operational Policies and Procedures.

Board members

Chairman:

 Dato' Seri Anwar Ibrahim, Chairman

Directors:

 Mr. Goh Ching Yin, Chairman of Executive Committee (EXCO), Member of Audit & Risk Committee (ARC) and Member of Nomination & Remuneration Committee (NRC) 
Tan Sri Mohammed Azlan Hashim, Chairman of Nomination & Remuneration Committee (NRC) and Member of Executive Committee (EXCO)
Mr. Lau Seng Yee, Member of Executive Committee (EXCO) and Member of Nomination & Remuneration Committee (NRC)
Datuk Azian Mohd Aziz, Member of Audit & Risk Committee (ARC)
Dato' Amirul Feisal Wan Zahir, Managing Director of Khazanah Nasional and Member of Executive Committee (EXCO)

Management team

 Managing Director – Dato' Amirul Feisal Wan Zahir
 Chief Financial Officer – Faridah Bakar Ali
 Executive Director, General Counsel, Company Secretary and Head, Corporate & Support Services – Dato' Mohamed Nasri Sallehuddin
 Executive Director and Head, Malaysian Investments – Datuk Amran Hafiz Affifudin
 Executive Director, Head, Dana Impak and Head, Healthcare – Bryan Lim
 Executive Director, Head, Public Markets and Head, Active Opportunities Portfolio – Datuk Hisham Hamdan
 Executive Director, Head, Private Markets and Head, Technology – Geoff Lee
 Executive Director and Head, Transport & Tourism – Wong Shu Hsien
 Executive Director and Head, Real Assets & Property – Selvendran Katheerayson
Executive Director and Head, Strategic Human Capital Management – Latifah Daud
Executive Director and Head, Governance, Risk & Compliance – Suhana Dewi Selamat
Head, Strategy and Head, Asset Allocation – Wong Wai Seng
Head of Consumer – Effizal Faiz Zulkifly
Director, Investments – Dr. Farid Mohamed Sani
Director, Investments – Ong King How
Head, Research – Nicholas Khaw
Head, Corporate Communications – Sherliza Zaharudin

Investments 
Khazanah pursues its overall mandate through a two-fund investment structure. The two funds, the Commercial Fund and the Strategic Fund, are established with distinct objectives, policies and strategies, and are managed separately via separate investment management divisions.

Commercial Fund 
The Commercial Fund is an inter-generational fund that seeks to generate risk-adjusted returns on a long-term basis, to grow financial assets and diversify sources of revenue for the nation. The Fund targets to generate a return of at least the Malaysian Consumer Price Index plus 3% on a 5-year rolling basis with a moderate risk tolerance level as follows:

 underperformance no more than 10% chance of a 30% annual loss
 funding no more than 10% chance of not achieving 1.5% portfolio yield.

The return target and risk tolerance are set by the Board and may be reviewed from time to time. The annual returns of the Fund are reinvested into the Fund and distributed to the Government based on an identified payout ratio. Any additional inflow of capital will be subject to approval of the Board. The Fund has the flexibility to invest across multi-asset classes in accordance to the strategic asset allocation and different geographies with a preference for active and direct investment strategies.

Strategic Fund 
The Strategic Fund is a developmental fund that seeks to undertake strategic investments, with long-term economic benefits, including holding strategic national assets. It targets to generate a return of at least the yield of the 10-year Malaysian Government Securities on a 5-year rolling basis, and to achieve its strategic objectives. Its return target is set by the Board and may be reviewed from time to time.

The Fund aims to be self-sustaining, with the primary source of funding for the Fund's activities to be generated from any internal surplus; any additional capital required above this available amount will be subject to the approval of the Board. The Fund invests and manages strategic assets as defined and classified below:

 Strategic assets – Domestic assets of national importance, such as critical infrastructure. > Held on behalf of the Government of Malaysia for the long-term. 
 Developmental assets – Long-term developmental investments with potential to deliver high economic impact. > These assets will be developed to achieve commercial viability at which point value realisation options may be considered. 
 New strategic assets – Either national infrastructure related or developmental in nature with clearly defined economic benefit targets and commercial viability plan identified.

The Fund pursues opportunities with the potential to become commercially viable or earn sufficient returns to operate without recourse to its shareholders. Larger-value transactions will generally be undertaken by the Fund, with the flexibility to invest across capital structures and a preference for co-investment and partnerships in entering all new developmental investments. Value realisation options can be considered when possible, on a commercial arm's-length basis. The investment themes of the Fund are reviewed on a regular basis based on global economic megatrends and national needs, and investment assets within the portfolio are similarly reviewed and assessed for relevance to strategic targets.

References

External links
 

1993 establishments in Malaysia
 
Government-owned companies of Malaysia
Sovereign wealth funds
Ministry of Finance (Malaysia)
Privately held companies of Malaysia